The Hirth F-30 is a horizontally opposed four-cylinder, two-stroke, carburetted aircraft engine, with optional fuel injection, designed for use on ultralight aircraft and homebuilts. It is manufactured by Hirth of Germany.

Development
The F-30 is equipped with a dual capacitor discharge ignition system and is free-air-cooled, with optional fan cooling. The cylinder walls are electrochemically coated with Nikasil. Standard starting is electric start and recoil start is not an option. The reduction drive system available is the G-40 gearbox with optional reduction ratios of 2.03:1, 2.25:1, 2.64:1, 2.96:1 and 3.33:1. A centrifugal clutch is also available as optional equipment.

The engine runs on a 50:1 pre-mix of unleaded 93 octane auto fuel and oil.

Variants
F-30
Four-cylinder horizontally opposed, two-stroke, aircraft engine with a dual 38 mm diaphragm carburetors. It has a factory rated time between overhaul (TBO) of 1,200 hours. Currently in production.
F-30E
Four-cylinder horizontally opposed, two-stroke, aircraft engine with fuel injection. It has a factory rated TBO of 1,200 hours. Currently in production.
F-30S
Four-cylinder horizontally opposed, two-stroke, aircraft engine with dual integral pumper carburetors. It has a factory rated TBO of 1,000 hours. Currently in production.
F-30ES
Four-cylinder horizontally opposed, two-stroke, aircraft engine with fuel injection. It has a factory rated TBO of 1,000 hours. Currently in production.

Applications

Specifications (F-30ES)

See also

References

Hirth aircraft engines
Air-cooled aircraft piston engines
Two-stroke aircraft piston engines